Things in the Game Done Changed is the third studio album by American singer Dave Hollister. It was released by Goodfellas Entertainment and Motown Records on September 17, 2002 in the United States.

Critical reception

Allmusic editor Dan LeRoy wrote that "despite its title, Things in the Game Done Changed doesn't mark any substantial shift in Hollister's formula: he still favors repetitive tunes rooted in gospel, substituting the ebb and flow of his powerful pipes for catchy hooks and melodies [...] There's still no hit that would give Hollister the recognition his voice deserves, but he's finally made an album as rock-solid as his singing style."

Track listing

Sample credits
 "My Everything" contains a sample from "Promise Me" as performed by Luther Vandross.
 "Keep Lovin' You (Remix)" contains elements of "In All My Wildest Dreams" as performed and written by Joe Sample.

Charts

References

2002 albums
Albums produced by Dave Hollister
Dave Hollister albums